The Vlasov equation is a differential equation describing time evolution of the distribution function of plasma consisting of charged particles with long-range interaction, e.g. Coulomb. The equation was first suggested for description of plasma by Anatoly Vlasov in 1938 and later discussed by him in detail in a monograph.

Difficulties of the standard kinetic approach
First, Vlasov argues that the standard kinetic approach based on the Boltzmann equation has difficulties when applied to a description of the plasma with long-range Coulomb interaction. He mentions the following problems arising when applying the kinetic theory based on pair collisions to plasma dynamics:

 Theory of pair collisions disagrees with the discovery by Rayleigh, Irving Langmuir and Lewi Tonks of natural vibrations in electron plasma.
 Theory of pair collisions is formally not applicable to Coulomb interaction due to the divergence of the kinetic terms.
 Theory of pair collisions cannot explain experiments by Harrison Merrill and Harold Webb on anomalous electron scattering in gaseous plasma.

Vlasov suggests that these difficulties originate from the long-range character of Coulomb interaction. He starts with the collisionless Boltzmann equation (sometimes called the Vlasov equation, anachronistically in this context), in generalized coordinates:

explicitly a PDE:

and adapted it to the case of a plasma, leading to the systems of equations shown below.  Here  is a general distribution function of particles with momentum  at coordinates  and given time . Note that the term  is the force  acting on the particle.

The Vlasov–Maxwell system of equations (Gaussian units)
Instead of collision-based kinetic description for interaction of charged particles in plasma, Vlasov utilizes a self-consistent collective field created by the charged plasma particles. The distribution function  for species  describes the number of particles of the species  having approximately the momentum  near the position  at time . Instead of the Boltzmann equation, the following system of equations was proposed for description of charged components of plasma (electrons and positive ions):

Here  is the elementary charge,  is the speed of light,  is the mass of the ion,  and  represent collective self-consistent electromagnetic field created in the point  at time moment  by all plasma particles.

The Vlasov–Poisson equation
The Vlasov–Poisson equations are an approximation of the Vlasov–Maxwell equations in the non-relativistic zero-magnetic field limit:

and Poisson's equation for self-consistent electric field:

Vlasov–Poisson equations are used to describe various phenomena in plasma, in particular Landau damping and the distributions in a double layer plasma, where they are necessarily strongly non-Maxwellian, and therefore inaccessible to fluid models.

Moment equations
In fluid descriptions of plasmas (see plasma modeling and magnetohydrodynamics (MHD)) one does not consider the velocity distribution. This is achieved by replacing  with plasma moments such as number density , flow velocity  and pressure . They are named plasma moments because the -th moment of  can be found by integrating  over velocity. These variables are only functions of position and time, which means that some information is lost. In multifluid theory, the different particle species are treated as different fluids with different pressures, densities and flow velocities. The equations governing the plasma moments are called the moment or fluid equations.

Below the two most used moment equations are presented (in SI units). Deriving the moment equations from the Vlasov equation requires no assumptions about the distribution function.

Continuity equation
The continuity equation describes how the density changes with time. It can be found by integration of the Vlasov equation over the entire velocity space.

After some calculations, one ends up with

The number density , and the momentum density , are zeroth and first order moments:

Momentum equation
The rate of change of momentum of a particle is given by the Lorentz equation:

By using this equation and the Vlasov Equation, the momentum equation for each fluid becomes

where  is the pressure tensor. The material derivative is

The pressure tensor is defined as the particle mass times the covariance matrix of the velocity:

The frozen-in approximation

 As for ideal MHD, the plasma can be considered as tied to the magnetic field lines when certain conditions are fulfilled. One often says that the magnetic field lines are frozen into the plasma. The frozen-in conditions can be derived from Vlasov equation.

By large we mean that

We then write

Vlasov equation can now be written

So far no approximations have been done.

This equation can be decomposed into a field aligned and a perpendicular part:

The next step is to write , where

It will soon be clear why this is done. With this substitution, we get

If the parallel electric field is small,

This equation means that the distribution is gyrotropic. The mean velocity of a gyrotropic distribution is zero. Hence,  is identical with the mean velocity, and we have

To summarize, the gyro period and the gyro radius must be much smaller than the typical times and lengths which give large changes in the distribution function. The gyro radius is often estimated by replacing  with the thermal velocity or the Alfvén velocity. In the latter case  is often called the inertial length. The frozen-in conditions must be evaluated for each particle species separately. Because electrons have much smaller gyro period and gyro radius than ions, the frozen-in conditions will more often be satisfied.

See also
 List of plasma physics articles
 Fokker–Planck equation

References

Further reading

Statistical mechanics
Non-equilibrium thermodynamics
Plasma physics
Equations
Transport phenomena
Moment (physics)